Oxyna longicauda is a species of fruit fly in the family Tephritidae.

Distribution

Mongolia.

References

Tephritinae
Insects described in 1990
Diptera of Asia